United Nations Security Council resolution 730, adopted unanimously on 16 January 1992, after recalling resolutions 719 (1991) and 729 (1992) the Council approved a report by the Secretary-General from 14 January, and decided to terminate the mandate of the United Nations Observer Group in Central America (ONUCA) with effect from 17 January 1992.

ONUCA's mandate was primarily extended at the request of Central and South American governments. Towards the end of the mandate, there were substantial reductions and a refocusing of its tasks to liaising with the security forces of the five Central American states. By ending the mandate of ONUCA, it allowed the Secretary-General Boutros Boutros-Ghali to transfer personnel to the nearby United Nations Observer Mission in El Salvador.

See also
 History of Central America
 History of Nicaragua
 List of United Nations Security Council Resolutions 701 to 800 (1991–1993)

References

External links
 
Text of the Resolution at undocs.org

 0730
History of Central America
Politics of Central America
History of Nicaragua
 0730
January 1992 events